Dương Ngạn Địch (?–1688) was a Chinese exile.

Dương Ngạn Địch was a general of Ming China, native to Guangdong, and swore allegiance to Koxinga. His position was Chief Commander of Longmen (龍門總兵, a place in mordern Qinzhou, Guangxi). In 1679, after the Revolt of the Three Feudatories was put down by Qing dynasty, he led 3000 soldiers and 50 ships came to Đà Nẵng together with Hoàng Tiến (黃進), Trần Thượng Xuyên and Trần An Bình (陳安平), and surrendered to Nguyễn lord. Dương Ngạn Địch and Hoàng Tiến were sponsored to Mỹ Tho by Nguyễn Phúc Tần, where Địch served as chief of a small Chinese community.

Địch was murdered by his assistant Hoàng Tiến in 1688. Tiến then revolted against Nguyễn lord but was put down.

See also
Minh Hương
Trần Thượng Xuyên
Mạc Cửu

References

1688 deaths
Hoa people
Generals of the Nguyễn lords
Minh Hương
Chinese emigrants to Vietnam
Vietnamese people of Chinese descent
Transition from Ming to Qing